David W. Denning is a British retired professor of infectious diseases and global health and medical mycology at Wythenshawe Hospital and the University of Manchester. He is the founding president, executive director and chief executive of Global Action For Fungal Infections (GAFFI), which focusses on the global impact of fungal disease.

He became the director of the UK's National Aspergillosis Centre in Manchester, which treats people with chronic pulmonary aspergillosis (CPA), and led the group that produced the first guidelines for CPA in 2016. He retired from clinical practice in 2020.

Career
David Denning studied medicine at Guy’s Hospital, London, and graduated in 1980. He then trained in internal medicine and infectious diseases in London and Glasgow. Between 1985 and 1987 he had a research post with the Medical Research Council, before a three-year fellowship in diagnostic microbiology and infectious diseases at Stanford University, which he completed in 1990.

He became professor of infectious diseases and global health and medical mycology at Wythenshawe Hospital and the University of Manchester. In 2009 he became the director of the UK's National Aspergillosis Centre in Manchester, which treats people with CPA. He is the founding president, executive director and chief executive of the GAFFI, which focusses on the global impact of fungal disease. Denning led the group that produced the first guidelines for CPA in 2016. He chairs the editorial board of a website which focusses on aspergillus and he leads an organisation which provides education on fungal diseases. Antifungal medications that he has contributed to research in include itraconazole, voriconazole, amphotericin B, caspofungin, and micafungin. He founded two spinout biotechnology companies. In 2020 he retired from clinical practice.

Selected publications
 
 (Co-authored)

 (Co-authored)

References

Year of birth unknown
British mycologists
British science writers
20th-century British medical doctors
21st-century British medical doctors
Living people
British medical writers
Academics of the University of Manchester
Year of birth missing (living people)